The orthography of the Old Norse language was diverse, being written in both Runic and Latin alphabets, with many spelling conventions, variant letterforms, and unique letters and signs. In modern times, scholars established a standardized spelling for the language. When Old Norse names are used in texts in other languages, modifications to this spelling are often made. In particular, the names of Old Norse mythological figures often have several different spellings.

The appearance of Old Norse in a written runic form first dates back to approximately AD 200–300. While there are remains of Viking runestones from the Viking Age today they are rare, and vary in use of orthography depending on when they were created.  Rune stones created near the end of the Viking Age tend to have a greater influence from Old English runes.

An understanding of the writing system of Old Norse is crucial for fully understanding the Old Norse language.  Studies of remaining rune stones from the Viking Age reveal many nuances about the spoken language, such as the constant use of alliteration.  A comparison of various whetstones from this time period with the works of Snorri Sturluson reveal that alliteration was common in many Old Norse writings, and were not only present in skaldic works.  This would then suggest that the Vikings closely tied their language to their auditory sense, which in turn would have helped with the continual transfer of their cultural memory, which was also closely tied to their language.

Latin alphabet orthography 

The following table gives various attested spellings of sounds and their IPA transcription. In general usage, an orthographic distinction of phones or phonemes is not necessarily held by every writer. For example, an author may only distinguish some vowels by length, and orthographic devices could be mixed and matched. Where the table lists a long-or-short phoneme , a specifically short  or long  phoneme represents additional spellings not covered by length marking rules. Likewise, a phonetic entry only lists spellings not used by the equivalent phoneme(s). N/A is used when no specific spelling is used, e.g. where all long vowel spellings are found using the rules for deriving long vowel spellings from the short vowel, or no general spelling is used, e.g. when short and long vowels are always spelled differently.

Legend:
 U: Unstressed
 E: Chiefly eastern
 : Long or short. See  columns for length and gemination marking.
 ?: 

The low/low-mid vowels may be indicated differently:
  = 
  = 
  = 

Dialect-specific sounds:
 : Icelandic; a, aa, á, o, ó, ǫ́; Normalized: á
 : Danish; e, æ

When dialectal mergers such as OEN monophthongization took place, regional spelling often changed to reflect this. Sometimes, both phonemes' spellings would be used, but confused.

The epenthetic vowel had different regional spellings.

Manuscript spelling 
The original Icelandic manuscripts, which are the main source of knowledge of Norse mythology, did not employ a unified system of spelling. During the Viking Age, many dialects of Old Norse were spoken. While they appear to have been mutually intelligible, the slight variances resulted in various spelling. Thus the same name might be spelled several different ways even in the original manuscripts. In particular, the length of vowels was only sporadically marked in many manuscripts and various umlauted vowels were often not distinguished from others. Another complication is that several shortcut forms for common words, syllables, and grammatical endings developed. One example is the use of the rune named  (man) for the word . Another is the use of a special glyph for the various r-endings so common in Old Norse. These scribal abbreviations are categorized as follows:

 Suspension, truncation, or curtailment: Certain letters of the word are omitted, with the abbreviation indicated by a superscript stroke (esp. dropping a nasal), dot(s) beside the letter, or occasionally a colon. Examples: Ꝥ for þat (etc.), ū for um, hō for hón, þan̅ for þann; .kgr. for konungr, .s. for sonr.
 Contraction: The first and last letters are written, and the abbreviation is indicated by a dot or superscript stroke.
 Special signs or brevigraphs: Symbols replacing words or syllables.
 Superscript letters: Regular letters contained in the word or letters specifically for abbreviation purposes. Often with syllabic content.

These abbreviation conventions and a majority of the signs are inherited from the Latin language itself, and were common to the Latin alphabet in other languages. However, other signs or conventions are specifically Norse, such as the  zig-zag.

Normalized spelling 
"Normalized spelling" can be used to refer to normalization in general or the standard normalization in particular. With normalized spelling, the manuscript spelling is altered to adhere to be more strict and regular. These respellings are designed to be phonemically precise rather than representative of the manuscripts. The degree of normalization may vary, but in general the text is at the end reduced to limited deviation from a regularized system, perhaps at the expense of some dialectal character.

For various reasons 19th century scholars came up with a standardized normalization of Old Norse which remains in use. It is primarily based on the so-called First Grammatical Treatise. Vowel length is marked and umlauted vowels are unambiguously represented. The standardized spelling employs a few characters that are not available in the most common electronic character sets. Replacements are often used, particularly in electronic formats. The most consequential is the use of ö instead of ǫ.

Runic orthography and transcription 

The following table associates the phonemes of the language to its orthographic representations.

U: Unstressed

Transcription of Danish and Swedish runestones 
When transcribing Old Norse texts from Danish and Swedish runestones, many scholars, but not all, use an orthography that is adapted to represent Old East Norse, the dialect of Old Norse in Denmark and Sweden. In this standard, the u-umlauted a represented by ǫ is not usually considered, but rendered as the underlying a, as in the name . Another difference is the representation of the phoneme ʀ, instead of simply r as in West Norse, where the ʀ phoneme merged with r earlier. However, even if they render the transcription according to the local pronunciation, the Rundata project presents personal names according to the previously mentioned standardized spelling in English translations. Here follows an example from the Orkesta Runestone (U 344):

Standardized spelling:
 
The rendering of Old East Norse:
 
But when translating into English, the standardized spelling is used:
 But Ulfr has taken three payments in England. That was the first that Tosti paid. Then Þorketill paid. Then Knútr paid.

Modernized Icelandic spelling 
In many modern Icelandic publications of Old Norse works, the modern Icelandic spelling is used. The orthography is essentially the same (since it was intentionally modelled after the aforementioned normalized Old Norse in the 19th century), but changes from Old Norse phonology to Icelandic phonology are incorporated in the translation that may not have been in the source text. One such difference is the insertion of u before r, when it is preceded by a consonant at the end of the word. Thus the Old Norse name Baldr comes out as Baldur in modern Icelandic. Other differences include vowel-shifts, whereby Old Norse ǫ became Icelandic ö, and Old Norse œ (oe ligature) became Icelandic æ (ae ligature). Old Norse ø corresponds in modern Icelandic to ö, as in sökkva, or to e, as in gera. There is also consonant lenition of final k and t to g and ð, e.g. mig for earlier mik and það for earlier þat.  These distinct features are summarized in the table below:

Anglicized spelling 

For the convenience of English writers and readers the Old Norse characters not used in English are commonly replaced with English ones. This can lead to ambiguity and confusion. Diacritics may be removed (á → a, ö → o). The following character conversions also take place:

 ø → o
 œ → o, oe
 æ → ae
 þ → th
 ð → th, d, dh

Another common convention in English is to drop consonant nominative endings:

 Egill → Egil
 Yggdrasill → Yggdrasil
 Gunnarr → Gunnar
 Sveinn → Svein
 Freyr → Frey
 Hildr → Hild

Sometimes a j is dropped after ey.

 Freyja → Freya

Other quirks sometimes seen include adding a Latin -a suffix to the names of goddesses.

 Frigg → Frigga
 Iðunn → Iduna

Obviously the various permutations allow for many possible spellings for a given name.

Some authors, for example, replace þ with th and ð with th, dh or d but keep the accents; others may not replace ǫ with ö but prefer o.

Thus, in addition to the various versions below, the name of Hǫðr could come out as:

 Hod, Hoðr, Hödhr, Hödr, Höd, Höð, Hoð, etcetera

List of names 
A list of some commonly encountered Old Norse names with variant spellings. * marks anglicizations.

Gods (Æsir) 
 Ása-Þórr, Asa-Thor*
 Bragi, Brage
 Baldr, Balder, Baldur. See Old Norse epenthetic vowel.
 Hǫðr, Hoth,* Hod,* Hothr,* Hodr, Hoder, Hodhr*
 Forseti, Forsete
 Heimdallr, Heimdalr, Heimdall,* Heimdal*
 Hœnir, Honir, Hoenir*
 Óðinn, Odin, Odhin,* Othin,* Odinn
 Ǫku-Þórr, Oku-Thor*
 Þórr, Thor,* Thorr* Tor
 Týr, Tyr, Ty*
 Vili, Vilji, Vile
 Vé, Ve

Goddesses 
 Frigg, Frigga
 Hlín, Hlin
 Iðunn, Idun,* Idunn, Iduna

Giants 
 Ægir, Aegir*
 Býleistr, Byleist
 Loki, Loke
 Bölþorn, Bolthorn

Giantesses 
 Hel, Hela
 Gerðr, Gerd, Gerth,* Gerthr*
 Rindr, Rind
 Angrboða, Angrboda
 Skaði

Animals 
 Freki, Freke
 Geri, Gere
 Huginn, Hugin*
 Jǫrmungandr, Jormungand, Iormungand (The Sea Serpent)
 Miðgarðsormr, Midgardsorm
 Muninn, Munin*
 Ratatoskr, Ratatusk, Ratatosk (The Squirrel on Yggdrasil)

Places 
 Ásgarðr, Asgard*
 Miðgarðr, Midgard*
 Niflheimr, Niflheim
 Útgarðr, Utgard*

Other 
 Æsir, Aesir*
 Hávamál, Havamal
 Ragnarǫk, Ragnarok
 Vǫluspá, Völuspá, Voluspa
 Yggdrasill, Yggdrasil*

See also 

First Grammatical Treatise
List of runestones
Runic transliteration and transcription

References

External links 
Medieval Nordic Text Archive, which contains Old Norse texts in manuscript and standard orthographies.

Orthography
Orthographies by language